RORO ferry services in India include the following, many others are under implementation or planning phases.

List

Assam 

 Majuli island in Brahmaputra River: 2 vessels operate on National Waterway 2 (NW2) by Inland Waterways Authority of India (IWAR) with capacity of 200 passenger, 4 cars and 2 trucks.
 Pandu Port (Guwahati) across Brahmaputra River: 1 vessel operates on NW2 by IWAR with capacity of 200 passenger, 4 cars and 2 trucks.
 Karimganj - Bangladesh over Barak River:

Gujarat 

 Dahej and Hazira in Gulf of Khambhat: Discontinued in early 2020. Restarted for passengers only in March 2021.
 DG Sea Connect: Ghogha (Bhavnagar district in Saurashtra) to Hazira (Surat district: The all-weather Ropax ferry, which can carry 550 passengers, 30 trucks, 7 smaller trucks, and 100 two-wheelers, reduces the 370-km road distance which takes 12 hours to 60-km sea route which takes 4 hours.

Goa 
Was in the implementation phase in 2017.

India-Bangladesh 

 Karimganj - Bangladesh over Barak River .

Kerala 

 Kochi (Kozhikod): It opened in November 2020.

Maharashtra 

 Ferry Wharf (Mumbai) - Mandwa (Alibag in Raigad district).

Operated since 2018 which cuts Ferry Wharf-Mandwa and Ferry Wharf-Mandwa-Goa travel time by 3 hours. Ferry Wharf to Alibag travel by road takes 4 hours, which is en route to Goa. Ferry from Ferry Wharf to Mandwa Jetty will take 30 minutes, and from Mandwa Jetty  it takes further 45 to drive to Alibag from where travelers can drive to Goa.

 Nerul (Navi Mumbai): It was in the implementation phase in 2017.

West Bengal 

 Kolkata to Northeast India .

See also

 Multi-Modal Logistics Parks in India
 List of National Waterways in India
 Sagar Mala project
 Setu Bharatam
 UDAN

References 

Water transport in India
Ferry transport in India